The 1952 Purdue Boilermakers football team was an American football team that represented Purdue University during the 1952 Big Ten Conference football season. In their sixth season under head coach Stu Holcomb, the Boilermakers compiled a 4–3–2 record, finished in a tie with Wisconsin for first place in the Big Ten Conference with a 4–1–1 record against conference opponents, and outscored opponents by a total of 188 to 151.

Notable players on the 1952 Purdue team included quarterback Dale Samuels, end Bernie Flowers, center Walter Cudzik, and tackle Fred Preziosio. Flowers was selected as a consensus first-team end on the 1952 College Football All-America Team.

Schedule

Game summaries

Ohio State
 Max Schmaling 23 rushes, 139 yards

Illinois
 Earl Heninger 17 rushes, 112 yards
 Max Schmaling 16 rushes, 112 yards

References

Purdue
Purdue Boilermakers football seasons
Big Ten Conference football champion seasons
Purdue Boilermakers football